Laloo Oraon, also spelt Lalu, is an Indian politician. He was a Member of Parliament, representing Lohardaga, Bihar in the Lok Sabha the lower house of India's Parliament as a member of the Janata Party.

References

External links
Official biographical sketch in Parliament of India website

Lok Sabha members from Bihar
Janata Party politicians
1942 births
Living people